Parascutigera guttata is a species of centipede in the Scutigeridae family. It is endemic to Australia. It was first described in 1925 by German myriapodologist Karl Wilhelm Verhoeff.

Distribution
The species occurs in Queensland. The type locality is Cedar Creek (now Ravenshoe) on the Atherton Tableland.

Behaviour
The centipedes are solitary terrestrial predators that inhabit plant litter and soil.

References

 

 
guttata
Centipedes of Australia
Endemic fauna of Australia
Fauna of Queensland
Animals described in 1925
Taxa named by Karl Wilhelm Verhoeff